Purple Lotus Buddhist School was a K–12 school located in Union City, California. It was founded in July 1997.  The school was accredited by the Western Association of Schools and Colleges. The school closed in 2016.

References

External links

Buddhism in California
Defunct schools in California
Buddhist schools in the United States
Buddhism in the San Francisco Bay Area
Religious schools in California
Educational institutions established in 1997
1997 establishments in California